Nama Pass (el. ) is a Himalayan mountain pass located in eastern Kumaun region of the Pithoragarh District of Uttarakhand, India.

It links Kuthi and Darma vallies, between the Kuthi and Sela and  villages. This was once a busy route for the local people, but is now rarely used.

Footnotes

External links
 Nama Pass trail, OpenStreetMap, retrieved 1 December 2021.

Mountain passes of Uttarakhand
Geography of Pithoragarh district
Mountain passes of the Himalayas